Salanx is a genus of icefishes native to Eastern Asia, ranging from Korea and Japan, through China to Vietnam.

Species
There are currently five recognized species in this genus:

 Salanx ariakensis Kishinouye, 1902
 Salanx chinensis (Osbeck, 1765) (Chinese noodlefish)
 Salanx cuvieri Valenciennes, 1850 (Noodlefish)
 Salanx prognathus (Regan, 1908)
 Salanx reevesii (J. E. Gray, 1831)

References

Salangidae
Fish of Asia
Taxa named by Georges Cuvier